LG CNS Co., Ltd. (Korean: 주식회사 엘지씨엔에스) is a subsidiary of LG Corporation founded in 1987 that provides information technology services including consulting, System Integration, Network Integration, Business Process Outsourcing, and Information Technology Outsourcing. Originally, LG CNS only focused on computer engineering such as designing, developing and operating computer network systems for LG Group. Then, the firm expanded its target customers from LG Group to other private organizations and governments. LG CNS also focuses on global markets running worldwide development centers and has overseas subsidiaries. Currently, LG CNS “is Korea’s largest IT service provider and has implemented a number of large-scale public IT infrastructure projects and played a major role in the Korean government's e-Korea initiative.”

Globalization

The former CEO of LG CNS, Shin Chae-chol, said "The Korean market constitutes a small percentage of the total global market. I think that unfettered expansion and cutthroat competition in the domestic medical market is meaningless. We plan to expand the scope of overseas projects centering on seven overseas branches in China, Southeast Asia, and the United States." According to the CEO’s expectation, LG CNS has expanded to 7 overseas subsidiary companies and development centers in China, India, U.S.A., the Netherlands, Indonesia, Brazil, Singapore and Japan. Overseas sales from LG CNS subsidiaries exceeded more than “200 billion won in 2007, focusing to realize its 2008 sales goal of 230 billion won in overseas markets.”

CSR (Corporate Social Responsibility)
LG CNS has also been doing CSR since its establishment. LG CNS IT Dream Project is the annual event which is designed for students in welfare institutions to cheer them up by inspiring them in for IT. Also, the company regularly hold an in-house bazaar to help handicapped children and women. Furthermore, “from 1995 to 2008, LG CNS has helped 628 sight-impaired people to have eyesight recovery operations. Not only these three events, but also many other CRS related event have done by LG CNS.”.

See also
 Electronic Data Systems (EDS) - the company that participated joint venture of STM, root company of LG CNS
 List of Korean companies

Notes and references

External links 
 Official website

LG Corporation
Information technology companies of South Korea
Technology companies established in 1987
South Korean brands
South Korean companies established in 1987
Companies based in Seoul